The bluntnose guitarfish or fiddlefish (Rhinobatos blochii) is a species of fish in the Rhinobatidae family. It is found in Namibia and South Africa. Its natural habitats are shallow seas and estuarine waters. It is threatened by habitat loss.

References

bluntnose guitarfish
Fish of Namibia
Fish of South Africa
Vertebrates of Southern Africa
Taxa named by Johannes Peter Müller
Taxa named by Friedrich Gustav Jakob Henle
bluntnose guitarfish
Taxonomy articles created by Polbot
Taxobox binomials not recognized by IUCN